FC SKA Minsk was a Belarusian main army football club of the Belorussian Military District, playing in Minsk. 

The club became the first champion of the Byelorussian Soviet Socialist Republic at regular football competitions that are played since 1934. It made its first appearance at the all-Union level (among teams of masters) in 1947 in the 1947 Vtoraya Gruppa placing last in its group. They played in the lower Soviet leagues until 1963, and then in the Belarusian SSR league until their dissolution in 1976.

Name changes
-1954: DO Minsk (or ODOKA Minsk)
1955–57: ODO Minsk
1958–59: SKVO Minsk
1960–76: SKA Minsk

Honours
 Football Championship of the Belarusian SSR
 Winners (8, record): 1934, 1935, 1940, 1946, 1950, 1952, 1964, 1965
 Runners-up (1): 1951

References

External links
SKA Minsk at FF 

Football clubs in Minsk
Defunct football clubs in Belarus
Armed Forces sports society